The Bornean pygmy shrew (Suncus hosei) is a species of shrew in the family Soricidae.  It was named for zoologist Charles Hose.

Distribution
This shrew is endemic to the international island of Borneo, particularly in northern Sarawak and northeastern Sabah states of Malaysia. It may be more widespread and occur in the nation of Brunei, and in northern Kalimantan province of Indonesia.

Its natural habitat is subtropical and tropical dry forests. It is often listed as the Etruscan shrew (Suncus etruscus) which is native from Europe and North Africa through Southeast Asia, but they are distinctly different species.

Conservation
It was listed as an IUCN Red List Vulnerable species since 1996, until changed to a Data Deficient species in 2008.

The exact threats are unknown. If it is forest dependent, it is threatened by habitat loss from: habitat conversion to agricultural plantations, especially for palm oil;  logging; and fires. It is not known, from botanical collecting, to have any protected populations within nature reserves or parks of the three countries.

References

Suncus
Endemic fauna of Borneo
Mammals of Borneo
Endemic fauna of Malaysia
Mammals of Malaysia
Sabah
Sarawak
Taxonomy articles created by Polbot
Mammals described in 1893
Taxa named by Oldfield Thomas